

The Point Paterson Desalination Plant was a planned municipal-scale solar-powered desalination plant with land-based brine disposal near Point Paterson in the locality of Winninowie in the Australian state of South Australia about  south of the city centre of Port Augusta. The Point Paterson Project was to utilise a salt flat owned by a salt company but which has not been in use for solar salt production for decades. The plant would have integrated renewable energy and desalination technologies to create environmentally-friendly electricity and water.  In particular, the project would have significantly reduced the usual greenhouse impacts associated with grid electricity demand for desalination. The project had attracted the interest of internationally renowned climatologist, the late Professor Stephen Schneider, who joined the Board of Acquasol in 2006.

If the plant had been built, it was expected to produce 5.5 gigalitres of water per year, enough to supply the needs of 34,000 people. Port Augusta (13,257 people) would receive 2 gigalitres per year free of cost during the first two years of the plant's operation. The plant would have been configured to expand if need be, with a potential output of 45 gigalitres per year.

The project never received enough funding, and the company was declared insolvent in 2014.

Salt harvesting
As the plant was to be built on the site of a salt pan, brine wastewater from the desalination process would be diverted onto the pan rather than pumped back into the gulf. Once the brine evaporates, the remaining salt was to be harvested and sold. The profits from the salt harvesting will be used to offset the cost of the desalination process while simultaneously preventing wastewater from being pumped back into the Spencer Gulf.

See also

 List of desalination plants in Australia

References

External links
 Desal plant developer Acquasol is seeking funding from private investors. APRIL 07, 2010
 Solar/Combined-Cycle Gas Turbine Hybrid Power Generation And Solar Desalination Facility

Desalination plants in Australia
Proposed infrastructure in Australia
Port Augusta
Infrastructure in South Australia